SM UB-2 was a German Type UB I submarine or U-boat in the German Imperial Navy during World War I. She sank eleven ships during her career and was broken up in Germany in 1920.

UB-2 was ordered in October 1914 and was laid down at the Germaniawerft shipyard in Kiel in November. She carried two torpedoes for her two bow torpedo tubes and was also armed with a deck-mounted machine gun. She was launched and commissioned as SM UB-2 in February 1915.

When UB-2 sailed to join the Flanders Flotilla in May 1915, she became the only member of her class to not be shipped by rail to Antwerp to join the unit. While in the flotilla, UB-2 sank eleven British ships of  under the command of Kptlt. Werner Fürbringer. The U-boat was assigned to the Baltic Flotilla in March 1916 relegated to a training role from December that same year. At the end of the war, UB-2 was deemed unseaworthy and unable to surrender at Harwich with the rest of Germany's U-boat fleet. She remained in Germany where she was broken up by Stinnes in February 1920.

Design and construction 
After the German Army's rapid advance along the North Sea coast in the earliest stages of World War I, the German Imperial Navy found itself without suitable submarines that could be operated in the narrow and shallow environment off Flanders. Project 34, a design effort begun in mid-August 1914, produced the Type UB I design: a small submarine that could be shipped by rail to a port of operations and quickly assembled. UB-2 was part of the initial allotment of eight submarines—numbered  to —ordered on 15 October from Germaniawerft of Kiel, just shy of two months after planning for the class began.

UB-2 was laid down by Germaniawerft on 1 November, one of the first two boats of the class started. She was launched at Kiel on 13 February 1915. She had a single  Daimler 4-cylinder diesel engine for surface travel, and a single  Siemens-Schuckert electric motor for underwater travel, both attached to a single propeller shaft.

UB-2 was armed with two  torpedoes in two bow torpedo tubes. She was also outfitted for a single  machine gun on deck. UB-2s standard complement consisted of one officer and thirteen enlisted men.

Service career 
The submarine was commissioned into the German Imperial Navy as SM UB-2 on 20 February under the command of Kapitänleutnant Werner Fürbringer, a 26-year-old native of Braunschweig, and underwent trials in German home waters.

UB-2 sailed from Germany to Flanders to join the Flanders Flotilla on 10 May 1915, and was the only UB I  or UC I boat in the flotilla to not be shipped  to Antwerp by rail. When UB-2 joined the flotilla, Germany was in the midst of its first submarine offensive, begun in February. During this campaign, enemy vessels in the German-defined war zone, which encompassed all waters around the United Kingdom (including the English Channel), were to be sunk. Vessels of neutral countries were not to be attacked unless they definitively could be identified as enemy vessels operating under a false flag.

The UB I boats of the Flanders Flotilla were initially limited to patrols in the Hoofden, the southern portion of the North Sea between the United Kingdom and the Netherlands. All six of the smacks—sailing vessels traditionally rigged with red ochre sails—were stopped, boarded by crewmen from UB-2, and sunk with explosives.

After UB-2s sister boat  pioneered a route around past British anti-submarine nets and mines in the Straits of Dover in late June, boats of the flotilla began to patrol the western English Channel. UB-2, and  soon followed with patrols in the Channel. Even though none of the boats sank any ships, by successfully completing their voyages they helped further prove the feasibility of defeating the British countermeasures in the Straits of Dover.

On 28 August, UB-2 was patrolling in the Corton–Yarmouth area when she sank the British trawler Miura. At 257 GRT, Miura bested Intrepid as the largest vessel sunk by UB-2 to-date.
As with the six vessels sunk in June, all three were stopped by UB-2 and sunk with explosives.

Germany's submarine offensive was suspended on 18 September by the chief of the Admiralstab, Admiral Henning von Holtzendorff, In response to American demands after German submarines had sunk the Cunard Line steamer  in May 1915 and other high-profile sinkings in August and September. Holtzendorff's directive from ordered all U-boats out of the English Channel and the South-Western Approaches and required that all submarine activity in the North Sea be conducted strictly along prize regulations. UB-2 did not sink any vessels over the next four months.

The German Imperial Navy began its second submarine offensive in February 1916, declaring, among other provisions, that all enemy vessels in the war zone were to be destroyed without warning. On 26 February 1916, UB-2 torpedoed and sank the cargo ship Arbonne, in what was ultimately her last wartime success.

Karl Neumann, who had been in the same cadet class as Fürbringer. Fürbringer went on to command six other U-boats, and was responsible for sinking nearly 100,000 tons of shipping. In 1933 he published a memoir of his World War I U-boat service, Alarm! Tauchen!!: U-boot in Kampf und Sturm, which included an overview of his career, including his time on UB-2.

By early February, the Flanders Flotilla was beginning to receive the newer, larger Type UB II boats. UB-2 was transferred into the Baltic Flotilla about a week after Neumann took command. Boats of the Baltic flotilla were based at either Kiel, Danzig, or Libau, but where UB-2 was stationed during this time is not reported in sources. While UB-2 was in the Baltic Flotilla, Neumann was succeeded by Oberleutnant zur See (Oblt.z.S.) Thomas Bieber in April, who was in turn succeeded by Oblt.z.S. Harald von Keyserlingk in July. According to authors R.H. Gibson and Maurice Prendergast, submarines assigned to training duties were "war-worn craft" unfit for service.

At the end of the war, the Allies required all German U-boats to be sailed to Harwich for surrender. UB-2 was one of eight U-boats deemed unseaworthy and allowed to remain in Germany. UB-2 was broken up by Stinnes on 3 February 1920.

Summary of raiding history

Notes

References

Bibliography

Further reading 
 

German Type UB I submarines
Ships built in Kiel
Ships built in Belgium
1915 ships
U-boats commissioned in 1915
World War I submarines of Germany